Munera is a town and municipality in the province of Albacete, Spain; part of the autonomous community of Castile-La Mancha.

Municipalities of the Province of Albacete